Hermann Friedrich Wilhelm Hinrichs (22 April 1794 in Karlseck, Hohenkirchen, now Wangerland, Friesland – 17 September 1861 in Friedrichroda) was a German philosopher.

Biography
Hinrichs studied theology at Strassburg, and philosophy at Heidelberg under Hegel, who wrote a preface to his Religion im innern Verhältniss zur Wissenschaft (Heidelberg, 1822).

He became a Privatdozent in 1819, and held professorships at Breslau (1822) and Halle (1824).

References

1794 births
1861 deaths
19th-century German philosophers
19th-century German Protestant theologians
Heidelberg University alumni
Academic staff of Heidelberg University
Academic staff of the University of Breslau
Academic staff of the University of Halle
People from Friesland (district)
Hegelian philosophers